Aurelia Ciurea (born 17 March 1982) is a Romanian aerobic gymnast.

Aurelia Ciurea started artistic gymnastics at the age of 4 in her hometown Constanta. She was part of the junior team, was competing for CSS 1 Farul Constanta and won many national titles in artistic gymnastics. She was part of the winning (team) title in the National Championship of Masters in 1994 and 1997, side by side with Simona Amanar. The last competition she participated in was the National Championship where she won 5 medals (2 gold: all-around, floor; 2 silver: beam and parallel bars; bronze in vault).  Despite the fact that she was a very talented gymnast, she didn't made it to the 1996 Olympic team because at that time she was too young. She was considered for the 2000 Olympics, but she retired from gymnastics in 1998.

After her retirement from women's artistic gymnastics (WAG), Aurelia started doing fitness and aerobics. In fitness, she won 3rd place at the National Championships in 1998. Aerobic gymnastics was at that time a relatively new "young" sport. Her first appearance, after only 6 months of training, was at the National Championships, where she won the bronze medal in individual women. 

At the age of 17 (1999), Aurelia was hit by a car when crossing the street. She was hospitalized for one month with severe trauma and fractures. The doctors told her that sport is out of the picture and that she should focus on other things. However, Aurelia couldn't accept the news so easily, especially since at the time the accident has happened, she was preparing for an important competition that could have decided a spot on the national team in aerobics. 
After the recovery period, she returned to the gym determined to start over. She saw and felt in her everyday practice, the disbelieve in the people surrounding her (coach, club, colleagues). But she could always count on the care and support of her mother. Together, they made a plan to reshape her figure and regain her strength and mobility. She and her mom started to run together in the evenings. Extra strength training was done at home and special attention was given to the food. The goal was that she should be in the first six gymnasts at the next National, in which she succeeded. After she turned 18, she was called to the national team for a test period. Aurelia worked very hard and remain on the national team until after the World Championships in 2004 (3 medals). Aurelia retired mainly due to back problems. However, other reasons that are not worth mentioning weighted heavily in the decision. 

Her accomplishments in aerobic gymnastics are 5 medals in World Championship (4 gold and 1 silver) and 2 medals in European Championships. She also won in trio 2 gold at the 2003 World Cup Series (Leipzig and Montlucon) and 1 bronze at the World Cup Finals (Sank Petersburg). She competed in Balcanic Championship as well, where she got bronze in individual women.

References

External links
Federation Internationale de Gymnastique Profiles: Aurelia Ciurea

People from Constanța
Living people
Romanian aerobic gymnasts
1982 births
Medalists at the Aerobic Gymnastics World Championships